The 2009 Melon Music Awards were held on Wednesday, December 16, 2009, at the Olympic Hall, Olympic Park in Seoul, South Korea. Organized by Kakao M through its online music store Melon, it was the first offline installment of the event in the show's history, having previously been held online since 2005.

Performers

Presenters 
 Jang Keun-suk & Park Shin-hye (only the second part) – Official Host & Presenter for the Top 10 Award
 Kim Na-young – Backstage Host
 Kim Tae-hoon – Best Songwriter award
 Jung Yong-hwa & Lee In-hye – Best Special Album
 Hong Seok-cheon & Yu Soo-hyun – Best Smart Radio Artist / Seok-cheon then Later introduced 2PM
 Lim Yo-hwan & Kim Taek-yong – Best Oddyesey
 Jung Yoon-gi & Jin Bora – Best Mania Artist / Bora then Later introduced 2NE1
 Son Jang-min – Best Star Award
 Jang Kwang-ho – Best Current Stream Song Award
 Choi Hyun-woo – Introducing Girls Generation Performance & Presenting the As I thought, T-Mobile Music Award
 Yiruma & Kim Joo-won – Y-Star Live Award
 Kim Chang-wan – Best New Artist
 Joo Young-hoon & Lee Yoon-mi – Artist of the Year
 Kim Hyung-suk & Ahn Hye-kyoung – Album of the Year
 Kim Tae-won & Park Shin-hye – Song of the Year

Winners and nominees

Main awards 

Winners and nominees are listed below. Winners are listed first and emphasized in bold.

Special awards

Other awards

Notes

References

External links 

 Official website

2009 music awards
Melon Music Awards ceremonies
Annual events in South Korea